Coleophora sublata is a moth of the family Coleophoridae that is endemic to Turkmenistan.

The larvae feed on Cerasus and Crataegus species. They feed on the leaves of their host plant.

References

External links

sublata
Moths of Asia
Endemic fauna of Turkmenistan
Moths described in 1988